The 1878 Greenock by-election was fought on 25 January 1878.  The by-election was called due to the resignation of the incumbent Liberal MP, James Johnston Grieve.  It was won by the Liberal candidate James Stewart.

References

Greenock by-election
1870s elections in Scotland
Greenock by-election
Greenock by-election
Politics of Renfrewshire
Politics of Inverclyde
By-elections to the Parliament of the United Kingdom in Scottish constituencies